Hubert John Francis Peters (June 5, 1902 – July 17, 1973), nicknamed Frosty Peters, was a professional ice hockey player who played 43 games in the National Hockey League. Born in Rouses Point, New York, the son of Hubert Peters, a printer, he played for the New York Rangers. Peters holds a record having played the second most games in the NHL without registering a point, at 44 behind Gord Strate, who played in 61.

Career statistics

References

External links

1902 births
1973 deaths
American men's ice hockey defensemen
Ice hockey players from New York (state)
New York Rangers players
People from Rouses Point, New York